The Stone's sheep (Ovis dalli stonei) or stone sheep is the more southern subspecies of thinhorn sheep, Ovis dalli.

Distribution
The global population of Stone's sheep is primarily found in Northern British Columbia and can often be seen licking minerals along the side of the Alaska Highway in areas such as Summit Lake, Stone Mountain Provincial Park, and Muncho Lake Provincial Park.

Description
Pelage colour variations range widely, from slate grey-brown with a white rump patch, dark tail and white on the inside of the hind legs, to an almost completely white/grey-white coat with a dark or black dorsal surface on the tail.  Horns are curved in form and vary in colour from a yellowish-brown to dark brown horns.

External links
 Western Association of Fish & Wildlife Agencies, Wild Sheep Working Group publication .
 Genome-wide set of SNPs reveals evidence for two glacial refugia and admixture from postglacial recolonization in an alpine ungulate .
 Management implications of highly resolved hierarchical population genetic structure in thinhorn sheep .
Determining the Maturity of Stone's Sheep Rams - Information for hunters on determining age and maturity of Stone sheep rams.

Ovis